Knots is the second album by UK group Sons of Noel and Adrian. It was released in 2012 by Broken Sound. The album received favourable reviews, most of which noted marked departure from the debut as the band explored and combined a wider array of genres, especially the "influence of Chicago’s avant-garde rock and jazz scene and guitarists such as former Slint-man David Pajo in particular".

In the run-up to the album release the band released five cryptic 'teaser' videos featuring music from the album.

The first single, "Come Run Fun Stella Baby Mother of the World", received airplay on BBC 6Music from the likes of Gideon Coe and Lauren Laverne who made the track her "headphones moment".

Track listing
"The Yard" – 4:12
"Come Run Fun Stella Baby Mother of the World" – 5:13
"Jellyfish Bloom" – 6:22
"Big Bad Bold" – 5:29
"Leaving Mary's Hand" – 3:00
"Cathy Come Home" – 4:24
"Black Side of the River" – 6:02
"Matthew" – 4:23
"Heroine" – 4:21

References

2012 albums